"Me quemo" is a song by Kendji Girac from the album Ensemble. It is the debut single of his album Ensemble

The song peaked at number 7 in the French charts and number 4 in the Belgian charts.

Charts

Weekly charts

Year-end charts

Certifications

References

2015 singles
2015 songs
Kendji Girac songs